Frank H. Renick (August 4, 1864 – May 6, 1921) was an American politician in the state of Washington. He served in the Washington State Senate and Washington House of Representatives.

References

1864 births
1921 deaths
Republican Party members of the Washington House of Representatives
Republican Party Washington (state) state senators